Designated Survivor: 60 Days is a 2019 South Korean television series based on the 2016–2019 American television series Designated Survivor. It stars Ji Jin-hee, Heo Joon-ho, Kang Han-na, Lee Joon-hyuk and Bae Jong-ok. The series aired on tvN and Netflix from July 1 to August 20, 2019.

Synopsis
Park Mu-jin (Ji Jin-hee) is the South Korean Minister of Environment, with little ambition as a politician. After a diplomatic incident involving free trade negotiations with the United States, and Park's dispute over numbers provided by its Environmental Protection Agency about pollution caused by imported cars, President Yang Jin-ma (Kim Kap-soo) dismisses him from the office.

The next day, as the President announces to the National Assembly that he is making peace with North Korea, the building explodes, killing all of the South Korean line of succession. Park Mu-jin, whose resignation had yet to become effective, survived the accident. He is sworn in as Acting President for 60 days, and starts uncovering the truth behind the bombing.

Cast

Main
 Ji Jin-hee as Park Mu-jin, Acting President of the Republic of Korea, formerly Minister of Environment and chemistry professor at KAIST. He is the show's counterpart of Tom Kirkman.
 Lee Joon-hyuk as Oh Yeong-seok, former ROK Navy Lieutenant Commander and independent member of the National Assembly. He is the show's counterpart of Congressman Peter MacLeish.
 Huh Joon-ho as Han Joo-seung, Chief Presidential Secretary. He is the show's counterpart of Charles Langdon.
 Kang Han-na as Han Na-kyung, NIS Terrorism Task Force Analyst. She is the show's counterpart to Hannah Wells.
 Bae Jong-ok as Yoon Chan-kyung, leader of the opposition Seonjin Republican Party. She is the show's counterpart of Kimble Hookstratten.

Supporting

Park Family
 Kim Gyu-ri as Choi Kang-yeon, First Lady of South Korea, Park Mu-jin's wife and a human rights lawyer. She is the show's counterpart of Alex Kirkman.
 Nam Woo-hyun as Park Si-wan, Park Mu-jin's teenage son. He is the show's counterpart of Leo Kirkman.
 Ok Ye-rin as Park Si-jin, Park Mu-jin's daughter. She is the show's counterpart of Penny Kirkman.

The Blue House
 Son Suk-ku as Cha Young-jin, Presidential Office Senior Administrator. He is the show's counterpart of Aaron Shore.
 Choi Yoon-young as Jung Soo-jung, secretary of Park Mu-jin. She is the show's counterpart of Emily Rhodes.
 Lee Moo-saeng as Kim Nam-wook, Presidential Office Administrator and later Acting Press Secretary, former defector from North Korea. He is the show's counterpart of Seth Wright.
  as Kang Dae-han, Presidential Security Service Agent. He is the show's counterpart of Mike Ritter.
 Lee Do-yeop as An Se-young, Chief of Civil Affairs.
 Baek Hyun-joo as Min Hee-kyung, Presidential Secretary.
  as Park Soo-kyo, Presidential Office Administrator.
  as Ko Young-mok, Director of the National Security Office.
  as Kim Eun-joo, administrator of the second subdivision office.

National Intelligence Service
 Kim Joo-hun as Jung Han-mo, NIS Terrorism Task Force Chief. He is the show's counterpart of Jason Atwood.
 Jeon Sung-woo as Seo Ji-won, NIS Terrorism Task Force Cyber Specialist. He is the show's counterpart of Chuck Russink.
  as Ji Yoon-bae, NIS Deputy Director. He is the show's counterpart of John Forstell.
 Lee Ha-yool as Kim Jun-oh, NIS agent. He is the show's counterpart and a composite of Senator Scott Wheeler and Gabriel Thompson.

Republic of Korea Army
 Choi Jae-sung as General Lee Gwan-mook, Chairman of Joint Chiefs of Staff and Chief Director of the Joint Defense Headquarters. He is the show's counterpart of General Harris Cochrane.
 Lee Ki-young as General Eun Hee-jung, Chief of Staff of the Republic of Korea Army.

Presidential Candidates
 Ahn Nae-sang as Kang Sang-goo, former three term Mayor of Seoul. He is the show's counterpart to and a composite of Governor James Royce and former president Cornelius Moss.

TBN Station
 Choi Jin-ho as Kim Dan, the news director.
 Oh Hye-won as Woo Sin-young, journalist. She is the show's counterpart to and a composite of Elizabeth Vargas, Lisa Jordan, and Abe Leonard.

Others
 Jeon Su-ji as Heo Jin-joo

Special appearances
 Kim Kap-soo as Yang Jin-man, the assassinated President of the Republic of Korea (episode 1). He is the show's counterpart of President Robert Richmond.
 Park Hoon as Major Jang Jun Ha (episode 6). He is the show's counterpart of Captain Max Clarkson.

Original soundtrack

Part 1

Part 2

Part 3

Viewership

Awards and nominations

International broadcasts
The series was purchased for broadcast in Iran by IRIB Ofogh in 2021.

References

External links
  
 
 

TVN (South Korean TV channel) television dramas
Korean-language television shows
2019 South Korean television series debuts
2019 South Korean television series endings
Designated Survivor (TV series)
South Korean television series based on American television series
Political drama television series
National Intelligence Service (South Korea) in fiction
South Korean political television series
South Korean military television series
Korean-language Netflix exclusive international distribution programming